Bogia may refer to:
 Bogia (gastropod), a genus of sea snails
 Bogia District, in Papua New Guinea
 Bogia languages, a group of Papuan languages
 Bogia (crater), a crater on Mars
 An old spelling of Béjaïa, city in Algeria

See also 
 Boggia, an Italian surname
 Bogya, a village in Slovakia
 Bojia (disambiguation)